San Rafael de Carvajal is one of the 20 municipalities of the state of Trujillo, Venezuela. The municipality occupies an area of 77 km2 with a population of 58,863 inhabitants according to the 2011 census.

Parishes
The municipality consists of the following four parishes:

 Antonio Nicolás Briceño
Campo Alegre
Carvajal
José Leonardo Suárez

References

Municipalities of Trujillo (state)